The Mughal–Rajput Wars were a series of battles fought between the Rajput Confederacy and the Mughal Empire which started with the Timurid ruler Babur's invasion of northwestern India and the head of the Rajput confederacy Rana Sanga's resistance to it. In 1526, when Babur invaded Hindustan, he faced stiff resistance from Rana Sanga in the Battle of Bayana, but defeated Rana in the Battle of Khanwa in 1527. The wars were, however, continued by the Rajput states, also by the descendants of both Rana Sanga and Babur. 
Babur's grandson Akbar faced heavy resistance from Rana Udai Singh II and Rana Pratap; Jahangir was opposed by Rana Amar Singh. Similarly Aurangzeb was opposed by Rana Raj Singh and his son Rana Jai Singh.

Chandrasen Rathore defended his kingdom for nearly two decades against relentless attacks from the Mughal Empire. The Mughals were not able to establish their direct rule in Marwar while Chandrasen was alive.

In 1679, the States of Mewar and Marwar rebelled against Aurangzeb. While a peace treaty was signed with Mewar after a year, war with Marwar went on until the death of Aurangzeb and concluded with the capture of Marwar by Rathore forces after Aurangzeb's death.

During the Rajput rebellion of 1708–10, the Mughals were forced to accept a humiliating peace treaty with the Rajput Rajas. The Rajputs forced the Mughals to make them governors of Malwa, Sindh and Gujarat.

Durgadas Rathore fought the Mughals for 30 years, until Ajit Singh was made the Raja of Marwar who became so influential in Mughal politics that he challenged the Mughal Emperor Farrukhsiyar by making an alliance with the Sayyid brothers. On 28 February 1719 Farrukhsiyar was deposed by Ajit Singh.

The Mughals tried to collect taxes in Rajputana during the late 18th century, however they were met with resistance in every town and village, leading to invasions by the Mughal generals. The most powerful Mughal generals had been reduced to a state of beggary after their campaigns in Rajputana during the 1750s. Salabat Khan had spent 60 lakhs against the Rajputs but could only extort 5 lakhs. Similarly Zulfiqar Jang, who had a strong political presence and troops, had ruined himself from the Rajput expedition. These campaigns affected the Mughal Empire financially and caused arrears and the disbanding of large amounts of troops. The Mughal capital itself was affected, leaving only a few retainers to guard the palace and man the artillery.

Battles 

 Battle of Bayana
Rana Sanga led the Rajput army and besieged the fortress of Bayana held by the Afghans under Nizam Khan in February 1527. Babur sent a Mughal contingent under Abdil Aziz, which was defeated by Rana Sanga.
 Battle of Khanwa
The Rajput Confederacy under Rana Sanga was defeated by Babur in 1527. This was the largest battle ever between the Mughals and the Rajputs involving a total of more than 150,000 soldiers.
 Siege of Chanderi 
Babur besieged and captured Chanderi Fort in Malwa and its ruler Medini Rai was defeated and killed. 
 Siege of Bikaner
Rao Jaitsi of Bikaner successfully defended his capital and defeated a Mughal army under Kamran, brother of Mughal emperor Humayun.
 Siege of Chittorgarh
Akbar led the Mughal army in besieging the famed Chittorgarh fort in 1567, which was then under the command of Jaimal Rathore and Patta Singh Sisodia, commanders of Udai Singh. The siege went on for four months, with the fortress walls being breached after the death of Jaimal, ensuring that the Mughals emerged victorious.
 Siege of Ranthambore (1568)
Rao Surjan Hada had to surrender Ranthambore Fort to Akbar after the latter successfully put the fort under siege. 
 Battle of Haldighati
The Mughal army under the command of Man Singh defeated Maharana Pratap's Mewari army in the field of Haldighati in 1576. But it was a futile victory as the Mughals could not expel Maharana from Mewar (The north western part only remained under him and he also could not keep Gogunda very long).
 Battle of Dewair
The first battle of Dewair took place in 1582 between armies of Maharana Pratap and the Mughal garrison of Dewair. Pratap's army defeated the Mughal army in this battle.
 Battle of Dewair
Both Amar Singh I and Asaf Khan claimed victory in an indecisive battle. III in 1606
 Rajput War (1679–1707) – A war between the Rathores and the Mughals that lasted for almost 30 years.
 Battle of Khanana (1681–1687) – Rathore rebels under Veer Durgadas Rathore defeated Mughal force. This battle resulted in major victory for Rathores. Kumpawat rathores captured Siwana town from Mughals. Mughal Commander Purdil Khan was killed in this battle.
 Battle of Ajmer (1690) – Veer Durgadas Rathore defeated Safi khan.
 Battle of Jodhpur (1707) – Veer Durgadas Rathore took advantage of the disturbances following the death of Aurangzeb in 1707 to seize Jodhpur and eventually evict the occupying Mughal force out of Marwar.
 Rajput Rebellion 1708-1710
July 1708 – Jai Singh and Ajit Singh storm Amber and Jodhpur and retake their capitals from the Mughal garrisons. 
 4–7 October 1708 – Battle of Kama – Ajit Singh Kachwaha, the Rajput zamindar of Kama defeated the combined armies of Mughal and Jats. The Mughal-Jat army numbered 18,000 while the Kachwahas had 10,000 horsemen. After a bitter fight the Mughal Fauzdar Raza Bahadur was killed and the injured Churaman retreated to Thun.
 October 1708 – Sayyid Hussain Barha of Mewat and Churaman Jat defeated near Sambhar by the Rathore–Kachhwaha army. Barha shot dead with his two brothers. 
 January 1710 – Mir Khan of Narnaul with 7000 Mughal troops and Churaman Jat with 6000 Jats effectively checked by Gaj Singh Naruka at Javli. 
 24 March 1710 – Battle of Tonk – Muhammad Khan of Tonk defeated by the Rathor–Kachwaha army.
 Battle of Bandanwara
Sangram Singh II of Mewar along with other Rajput chiefs defeated the imperial Mughal army
 Battle of Mandan
The Shekhawati Rajputs defeated a Mughal force under Mitrasen Ahir, Peero Khan and Kale Khan. After heavy losses Peero Khan died and Mitra Sen fled.
Siege of Kanud
A small garrison of 400 Rajputs under the ailing Nawal Singh Shekhawat repelled Mughal attacks until Nawal died from his illness. The mughals negotiated with the Rajputs and exchanged Kanud fort for other villages, which were given to Nawal's widow.
 Battle of Khatu Shyamji
Devi Singh Shekhawat defeated the imperial army under Murtaza Khan Bhadech.

References 

Conflicts in 1525
1525 in India
Babur
Rajput era